Kovlands IF is a Swedish football club located in Kovland.

Background
Kovlands IF currently plays in Division 4 Medelpad which is the sixth tier of Swedish football. They play their home matches at the Ånäsvallen in Kovland.

The club is affiliated to Medelpads Fotbollförbund.

Season to season

Footnotes

External links
 Kovlands IF – Official website
 Kovlands IF – A-lag website

Sport in Västernorrland County
Football clubs in Västernorrland County
1903 establishments in Sweden